The 1932 UCI Track Cycling World Championships were the World Championship for track cycling. They took place in Rome, Italy from 27 August to 4 September 1932. Three events for men were contested, two for professionals and one for amateurs.

Medal summary

Medal table

See also
 1932 UCI Road World Championships

References

Track cycling
UCI Track Cycling World Championships by year
International cycle races hosted by Italy
Sports competitions in Rome
1932 in track cycling
August 1932 sports events
September 1932 sports events
1930s in Rome